Harold Viets Camp Jr. (March 31, 1935 – February 14, 2022) was an American lawyer and politician.

Camp was born in Hartford, Connecticut, and grew up in New Britain, Connecticut. He graduated from Wesleyan University in 1957 and from Columbia Law School in 1960. Camp clerked for a United States federal judge in California for one year. He then practiced law in New York City, New York. Camp moved with his wife and family to Ridgefield, Connecticut, and continued to practice law. He was also involved with the real estate business. Camp served in the Connecticut House of Representatives from 1968 to 1974 and was a Republican. He closed his law practice and moved with his wife to Stony Creek, Connecticut. in 2008. He died in Stony Creek on February 14, 2022, at the age of 86.

References

1935 births
2022 deaths
People from Branford, Connecticut
Politicians from Hartford, Connecticut
Politicians from New Britain, Connecticut
Wesleyan University alumni
Columbia Law School alumni
Lawyers from Hartford, Connecticut
Lawyers from New York City
Businesspeople from Hartford, Connecticut
Republican Party members of the Connecticut House of Representatives